Jacques Gouin de Beauchêne (2 January 1652 – 26 July 1730) was a French explorer and leader of the first French trading expedition to the Pacific. His name is also spelled as Beauchesne. He was born in Saint-Malo in Brittany, and died there at 78 years of age.

As captain of the Phelypeaux, he led a fleet of four ships from France in 1698; however, only the Phelypeaux and the Comte-de-Maurepas made it through the Strait of Magellan in 1699 after an arduous winter passage. He named one of the islands in the Strait after Louis XIV of France, and a bay after Louis, le Grand Dauphin. After a trading cruise along the coast of Chile and Peru, taking in a visit to the Galapagos Islands, he returned via Cape Horn, passing the Cape on 9 January 1701. Ten days later, he discovered the island that was named for him, Beauchene Island. He was the first Frenchman to sail Cape Horn from west to east.

References

1652 births
1730 deaths
French explorers
People from Saint-Malo
17th-century explorers